Redwood Tree may refer to:
Redwood (disambiguation), the English name of a number of tree species
"Redwood Tree" (song), written by Van Morrison